Casalecchio Palasport is a railway station serving Casalecchio di Reno, in the region of Emilia-Romagna, northern Italy. The station is located on the Casalecchio-Vignola railway. The train services are operated by Trenitalia Tper.

The station is currently managed by Ferrovie Emilia Romagna (FER).

Location
Casalecchio Palasport railway station is situated west of the city centre, next to the Unipol Arena.

History
The station was opened on February 28, 1994.

Features
The station does not feature any building.

It consists of a single track.

Train services

The station is served by the following service(s):

 Suburban services (Treno suburbano) on line S2A, Bologna - Vignola

See also

 List of railway stations in Bologna
 List of railway stations in Emilia-Romagna
 Bologna metropolitan railway service

References 

Palasport
Railway stations opened in 1994